PIARC (World Road Association) is an international forum for the discussion of all aspects of roads and road networks.

Overview 
Though established principally for professionals in its 122 member countries round the world, it also provides an overview of the policies and trends that affect all road users. The Association was founded in 1909, following the first international road congress held in Paris when it was the called the Association Internationale Permanente des Congrès de la Route (AIPCR), or in English, the Permanent International Association of Road Congresses (PIARC). In 2019, it formally adopted the name PIARC.

Its head office is located in Paris where its origins began in 1908.

Terminology

In 1931, the first edition of the "Road Dictionary" was published in six languages (Danish, English, French, German, Italian, and Spanish). The World Road Association has continued working on terminology ever since. In 2007, the eight edition was released in five languages (English, French, German, Portuguese, and Spanish).

See also
 Regional associations of road authorities

External links

Literature 
 .

References 

International organizations based in France
International professional associations
Organizations based in Paris
Organizations established in 1909
Road transport organizations
Transport organizations based in France